Jerry S. Wolinsky is an American scientist, currently the Bartels Family and Opal C. Rankin Professor of Neurology at University of Texas Health Science Center at Houston (UTHealth) and an Elected Fellow of the American Association for the Advancement of Science.

References

Year of birth missing (living people)
Living people
Fellows of the American Association for the Advancement of Science
University of Texas Health Science Center at Houston faculty
University of Illinois alumni
American scientists